The 53rd Indian Infantry Brigade was an infantry formation of the Indian Army during the Second World War. It was formed in March 1942, in India. In April 1942, it was assigned to the 20th Indian Infantry Division but  was soon after in August 1942 transferred to the 25th Indian Infantry Division, staying with the 25th until the end of the war.

Formation
14th Battalion, 10th Baluch Regiment March to August 1942 
9th Battalion, 9th Jat Regiment April to July 1942 – 1942
2nd Battalion, 2nd Punjab Regiment April 1942 to August 1943
9th Battalion, York and Lancaster Regiment June 1942 to June 1944
MG Battalion, 13th Frontier Force Rifles September 1942 to September 1944
4th Battalion, 18th Royal Garhwal Rifles August 1943 to August 1945
17th Battalion, 5th Mahratta Light Infantry September 1944 to August 1945
7th Battalion, 16th Punjab Regiment January 1945
Kumaon Rifles April to August 1945

See also

 List of Indian Army Brigades in World War II

References

Brigades of India in World War II
Military units and formations in Burma in World War II